Mansuriyeh (also Romanized as Manşūrīyeh; also known as Manşūrī) is a village in Paskhan Rural District, in the Central District of Darab County, Fars Province, Iran. At the 2006 census, its population was 554, in 122 families.

References 

Populated places in Darab County